Nakhon Si Thammarat is a municipality in Southern Thailand.

Nakhon Si Thammarat may also refer to:

Nakhon Si Thammarat province
Nakhon Si Thammarat Range (also called Banthat mountains)
Nakhon Si Thammarat Kingdom
Monthon Nakhon Si Thammarat, an administrative unit of the early 20th century and successor of the kingdom
Mueang Nakhon Si Thammarat district